The Lukang Folk Arts Museum is a museum in Lukang Township, Changhua County, Taiwan.

History
The museum was originally built as a residence of Koo Hsien-jung. The construction started in 1913 and was completed 6 years later in 1919. In the 1920s and 1930s, the building became the venue for international conferences with foreign dignitaries. In 1973, the building was converted into the Lukang Folk Arts Museum, with all the buildings, land, furniture, utensils and collector's items having been donated by the Koo family and other private benefactors. The museum holds more than 6,000 articles. The items exhibited in the museum mostly date from the mid-Ching dynasty to the early years of the Republic. Household, travel, and recreational items, as well as religious implements and celebratory artifacts are displayed for visitors.

Architecture
The museum was designed by Japanese architect Moriyama Matsunosuke. The building has a strong local flavor. The architecture of the museum and the pieces housed within not only demonstrate craftsmanship, but also a thriving history of Lukang.

The museum has the following buildings:
 Yang Building: The Yang Building was built in 1919. The design and materials used in the Meiji styled structure are excellent examples of that time in Taiwan.
 Ku Feng Building: This 18th century wood and brick structure is of a Min-nan (Southern Fukien) style. The building has a traditional feel to it.

Exhibition
The museum houses a collection of Ming and Qing dynasty artifacts: vintage photographs, lacquer ware, porcelain, carved stones, embroidery, musical instruments, and other items. The building is an unusual combination of Asian architecture and Western architecture.

Transportation
The museum is accessible by bus from Changhua Station of Taiwan Railways.

See also
 List of museums in Taiwan

References

External links

 

1973 establishments in Taiwan
Art museums and galleries in Taiwan
Buildings and structures completed in 1919
Decorative arts museums
Folk art museums and galleries
Local museums in Taiwan
Museums established in 1973
Museums in Changhua County
Taiwanese folklore